Lawrence Alan Kudlow (born August 20, 1947) is an American conservative broadcast news analyst, columnist, journalist, political commentator, talk radio host, and television personality. He is the chief financial program host for the Fox network who served as the Director of the National Economic Council during the Trump Administration from 2018 to 2021. He assumed that role after his previous employment as a CNBC television financial news host.

Kudlow began his career as a junior financial analyst at the New York Federal Reserve. He soon left government to work on Wall Street at Paine Webber and Bear Stearns as a financial analyst. In 1981, after previously volunteering and working for left-wing politicians and causes, Kudlow joined the administration of Ronald Reagan as associate director for economics and planning in the Office of Management and Budget.

After leaving the Reagan Administration during the second term, Kudlow returned to Wall Street and Bear Stearns, serving as the firm's chief economist from 1987 until 1994. During this time, he also advised the gubernatorial campaign of Christine Todd Whitman on economic issues. In the late 1990s, after a publicized battle with cocaine and alcohol addiction, Kudlow left Wall Street to become an economic media commentatorfirst with National Review, and later hosting several shows on CNBC.

Early life
Kudlow was born and raised in New Jersey, the son of Ruth (née Grodnick) and Irving Howard Kudlow. His family is Jewish. He attended The Elisabeth Morrow School in Englewood, New Jersey, until the sixth grade. He then attended the Dwight-Englewood School through high school.

He graduated from the University of Rochester in Rochester, New York, with a bachelor's degree in history in 1969. Although he completed only an undergraduate degree (aside from his foreign policy coursework at Princeton), he claims that his particular history curriculum dealt heavily with themes in economics, especially on trade policy.

In 1971, Kudlow enrolled in the master's program at Princeton University's Woodrow Wilson School of Public and International Affairs, but he left before completing his degree.

Career
In 1970, while he was still a Democrat, Kudlow joined Americans for Democratic Action chair Joseph Duffey's "New Politics" senatorial campaign in Connecticut which also attracted an "A-list crowd of young Democrats", including Yale University law student Bill Clinton, John Podesta, and Michael Medved, another future conservative. Duffey was a leading anti-war politician during the Vietnam war era. Duffey's campaign manager called Kudlow a "brilliant organizer". In 1976, he worked on the U.S. Senate campaign of Daniel Patrick Moynihan, along with Tim Russert, against Conservative Party incumbent James L. Buckley, brother of William F. Buckley, Jr.

Kudlow began his career as a staff economist at the Federal Reserve Bank of New York, taking a position "as a junior economist in a job where a master's degree wasn't required". He worked in the division of the Fed that handled open market operations.

During the first term of the Reagan administration (1981–1985), Kudlow was associate director for economics and planning in the Office of Management and Budget (OMB), a part of the Executive Office of the President. In April 2005, New York Governor George Pataki included Kudlow in a six-member state tax commission.

Kudlow's name was floated by Republicans as a potential Senate candidate in either Connecticut or New York in 2016. In October 2015, U.S. Senator Richard Blumenthal, in an email to supporters, attacked Kudlow as "a champion of big corporations and big money" despite Kudlow's not announcing a run. In early December 2015, Jack Fowler of National Review created a 527 organization that encouraged Kudlow to run.

Director of the National Economic Council 

In March 2018, Donald Trump appointed Kudlow to be Director of the National Economic Council, succeeding Gary Cohn. He assumed office on April 2, 2018.

At the time, Kudlow said that the nonpartisan Congressional Budget Office was untrustworthy. He dismissed CBO's estimate that the 2017 Tax Cuts and Jobs Act would increase the deficit by $1.3 trillion, saying, "Never believe the CBO. Very important: Never believe them. They're always wrong, especially with regard to tax cuts, which they never score properly." Numerous studies of the tax plan, whether by non-partisan organizations, Wall Street analysts, or right-leaning research organizations, showed that the tax plan would increase the deficit. In July 2018, Kudlow supported his earlier opinion that the CBO is not credible when he asserted, "Even the CBO numbers show now that the entire $1.5 trillion tax cut is virtually paid for by higher revenues and better nominal GDP." The CBO later found that the tax cut reduced revenues and that the resulting deficits increased by $1.9 trillion after accounting for macroeconomic feedback.

Also in April, Kudlow alleged that U.S. Ambassador to the United Nations Nikki Haley had announced that the U.S. would soon sanction Russia due to "momentary confusion." After Haley contradicted Kudlow's claim, Kudlow called her to apologize.

In April 2018, Kudlow stated, "The trouble I had with the Obama [stimulus] program was it was all spending." However, about 35% of the stimulus was tax relief, including a $116 billion income tax cut.

As Trump celebrated the five-month anniversary of the tax cut on June 29, 2018, Kudlow falsely asserted that the tax cut was generating such growth that "the deficit, which was one of the other criticisms, is coming down – and it's coming down rapidly." Kevin Hassett, chairman of Trump's Council of Economic Advisers, noted days earlier that the deficit was "skyrocketing", which is consistent with the analysis of every reputable budget analyst. Kudlow later asserted that he was referring to future deficits. Other budget forecasts indicated deficits in coming years would increase as a result of the Trump tax cut unless they were offset by major spending cuts. Barring such reductions, the CBO projected the tax cut would add $1.27 trillion to deficits over the next decade, even after considering any economic growth the tax cut might generate.

Kudlow asserted on June 29, 2018, that "capital investment, you know, for new jobs and better careers, [is] flowing in from all corners of the world", though foreign direct investment into America  declined significantly during the two years through August 2019.

On June 29, 2018, Kudlow stated, "This is now, the USA, according to the OECD, the hottest economy in the world." However, this was not a new phenomenon under the Trump presidency, as by 2015 the American GDP growth rate had been almost twice that of other industrialized countries since 2008, and by 2015 America had created as many jobs as all other industrialized countries combined since 2010. Kudlow also asserted: "They've been saying that all along, OK? We could never get to 3% growth... It couldn't be done, they say. It's being done." However, analysts have actually said that 3% sustained growth was unlikely, rather than periodic quarters of growth of 3% or more. From 2009 through 2016, GDP growth exceeded 3% in eight quarters – including 5.5% and 5.0% in consecutive quarters of 2014 – yet it did not sustain 3% or more for any full year. Although GDP exceeded 3% in two consecutive quarters of 2017, the average growth was 2.4% through Trump's first five quarters in office. The final figure for first quarter 2018 GDP growth was released the day before Kudlow spoke – coming in at 2.0%. Three months later GDP for the second quarter of 2018 was announced at an annual growth rate of 4.1%.

On August 28, 2018, after Trump accused Google of rigging search results to show information biased against him, Kudlow told reporters, "We're taking a look at" regulating Google.

In November 2018, eleven months after the Trump tax cut, Kudlow stated, "The tax cut has paid for itself already barely through the first calendar year", although data released later showed that federal revenue had declined and that the deficit had increased during fiscal year 2018.

During the 2018–2019 partial federal government shutdown, approximately 420,000 federal workers deemed "essential" were compelled to continue working without pay. On the 34th day of the shutdown, Kudlow asserted that such workers were "volunteering" to work for their love of the country and "presumably their allegiance to President Trump."

In the summer of 2019, Kudlow twice asserted that the proposed United States–Mexico–Canada Agreement would increase GDP by half a percentage point and job creation by 180,000 per year after ratification. The International Trade Commission analysis that he was apparently referencing estimated that the Agreement would increase GDP by 0.35% and jobs by 176,000 six years following ratification. Another study by the Congressional Research Service found that the Agreement would not have a measurable effect on jobs, wages, or overall economic growth.

On February 25, 2020, as a coronavirus pandemic was emerging as a global pandemic, Kudlow stated, "We have contained this, I won't say airtight but pretty close to airtight."

In June 2020, amid the George Floyd protests against racism and police brutality, Kudlow said, "I don’t believe there is systemic racism in the U.S."

Financial services industry 
In 1987, Kudlow was hired by Bear Stearns as its chief economist and senior managing director. Kudlow also served as an economic counsel to A. B. Laffer & Associates, the San Diego, California, company owned by Arthur Laffer, a major supply-side economist and promoter of the "Laffer Curve", an economic measure of the relationship between tax levels and government revenue. Kudlow was fired from Bear Stearns in the mid-1990s due to his cocaine addiction.

He was a member of the board of directors of Empower America, a supply-side economics organization founded in 1993 and merged in 2004 with the Citizens for a Sound Economy to form FreedomWorks. Kudlow is also a founding member of the Board of Advisors for the Independent Institute and consulting chief economist for American Skandia Life Assurance, Inc., in Connecticut, a subsidiary of insurance giant Prudential Financial.

Media 
Kudlow became Economics Editor at National Review Online (NRO) in May 2001. In December 2007, NRO published a Kudlow article entitled Bush Boom Continues, in which he asserted the economy would continue to expand for years to come. The Great Recession, the worst economic downturn since the Great Depression, began that month.

Kudlow served as one in a rotating set of hosts on the CNBC show America Now, which began airing in November 2001. In May 2002, the show was renamed Kudlow & Cramer, and Kudlow and Jim Cramer became the permanent hosts. In January 2005, Cramer left to host his own show, Mad Money, and the program's name was changed the next month to Kudlow & Company. The program went on hiatus in October 2008, returned in January 2009 as The Kudlow Report, and ended its run on CNBC in March 2014.

Kudlow is also a regular guest on Squawk Box. He has contributed to CNBC.com on MSN. Starting in 2004, he also appeared on The John Batchelor Show as a co-host on Tuesdays and as a substitute, until he left to become an economics advisor to President Trump. In March 2006, Kudlow started to host a talk radio show on politics and economics on WABC as The Larry Kudlow Show aired on Saturday mornings from 10am to 1pm ET and via nationwide syndication in the US starting June 5, 2010.

In February 2021, Larry Kudlow joined Fox Business Network to host a new weekday program.

Political views

Economy 
A self-described "Reagan supply-sider", Kudlow is known for his support for tax cuts and deregulation. He argues that reducing tax rates will encourage economic growth and ultimately increase tax revenue and, while acknowledging the limits of growth, that economic growth will clear deficits. According to The Economist, Kudlow is "the quintessential member of the Republican Party's business wing". Kudlow has no formal economics qualifications.

In 1993, Kudlow said that Bill Clinton's tax increases would dampen economic growth. When the economy boomed in the late-1990s, Kudlow credited it to tax cuts and capital gains rate cut enacted during the Reagan administration.

Kudlow was a strong advocate of George W. Bush's substantial tax cuts, and argued that the tax cuts would lead to an economic boom of equal magnitude. After the implementation of the Bush tax cuts, Kudlow said year after year that the economy was in the middle of a "Bush boom", and chastised other commentators for failing to realize it. Kudlow firmly denied that the United States would enter a recession in 2007, or that it was in the midst of a recession in early to mid-2008. In December 2007, he wrote: "The recession debate is over. It's not gonna happen. Time to move on. At a bare minimum, we are looking at Goldilocks 2.0. (And that's a minimum). The Bush boom is alive and well. It's finishing up its sixth splendid year with many more years to come". 

In a May 2008 column entitled "Bush's 'R' is for 'Right, Kudlow wrote: "President George W. Bush may turn out to be the top economic forecaster in the country". By July 2008, Kudlow continued to deny that the economy was looking poor, stating that "We are in a mental recession, not an actual recession." Lehman Brothers collapsed in September 2008, creating a full-blown international banking crisis.

As George W. Bush took office in January 2001, America was in the fourth consecutive fiscal year of federal budget surpluses and the CBO projected increasing surpluses in each year through 2010, totaling over $5 trillion. Days before Bush signed his tax cut plan in June, Kudlow predicted it would cause future budget surpluses to rise. Instead, there were budget deficits in every fiscal year of the Bush administration.

In their 2015 book Superforecasting, University of Pennsylvania political scientist Philip E. Tetlock and Dan Gardner refer to Kudlow as a "consistently wrong" pundit, and use Kudlow's long record of failed predictions to clarify common mistakes that poor forecasters make.

Kudlow supported free trade prior to his White House appointment. As recently as three weeks before taking office, he co-authored with Stephen Moore and Art Laffer an opinion piece entitled Tariffs Are Taxes., in which he argued against the proposed Trump tariffs. However, upon his appointment, he said that he was "in accord" with President Trump's steel and aluminum tariffs, apparently as a "negotiating tactic".

Kudlow is not known as a deficit hawk.

Politics 
On June 26, 2002, in a commentary in NRO titled "Taking Back the Market – By Force", Kudlow called for the United States to attack Iraq, saying Saddam Hussein had "weapons of mass destruction at his disposal" and that "a lack of decisive follow-through in the global war on terrorism is the single biggest problem facing the stock market and the nation today". In an open letter dated February 12, 2003, he endorsed George W. Bush's policies on economic growth and jobs.

In 2016, Kudlow endorsed Republican presidential candidate Donald Trump. He later defended Executive Order 13767, Trump's plan to build a wall along the Mexico–United States border, declaring it was necessary to prevent terrorists from entering the United States, the United States was at war with ISIS and Trump was going to do what was necessary to protect the country. He also penned an article for RealClearPolitics advocating for conservative unity in the election and asking his conservative peers to stop criticizing Trump and instead help him become a stronger candidate.

After the 2018 G7 Summit in Charlevoix, Canada, he criticized Canadian Prime Minister Justin Trudeau in a candid interview with CNN's Jake Tapper, saying that Trudeau had "stabbed us in the back".

Personal life
Kudlow has been married three times: In 1974, he married Nancy Ellen Gerstein, an editor in The New Yorker magazine's fiction department, with the marriage lasting about a year. In 1981, he married Susan (Cullman) Sicher, whose grandfather was businessman Joseph Cullman and whose great-grandfather was businessman Lyman G. Bloomingdale. The Washington wedding was presided over by U.S. District Judge John Sirica. In 1986, he married Judith "Judy" Pond, a painter and Montana native.

In the mid-1990s, Kudlow left Bear Stearns and entered a 12-step program in order to deal with his addictions to cocaine and alcohol. He subsequently converted to Catholicism under the guidance of Father C. John McCloskey III.

Kudlow is a member of the Catholic Advisory Board of the Ave Maria Mutual Funds. He served as a member of the Fordham University Board of Trustees and is on the advisory committee of the Kemp Institute at the Pepperdine University School of Public Policy.

On June 11, 2018, Kudlow suffered what the White House referred to as a "very mild" heart attack. White House Press Secretary Sarah Sanders stated that Kudlow had been admitted to the Walter Reed Army Medical Center in Washington, D.C., and that he was "doing well" and expected a "full and speedy recovery". The incident took place on the same day President Trump was set to meet with North Korean leader Kim Jong-Un in Singapore for the American summit with North Korea. On June 13, Kudlow was discharged from the hospital.

Books
 American Abundance: The New Economic & Moral Prosperity, 1997, HarperCollins, 
 Bullish On Bush: How George Bush's Ownership Society Will Make America Stronger, 2004, Rowman & Littlefield, authored by Stephen Moore and with comments by Kudlow
 Tide: Why Tax Cuts Are the Key to Prosperity and Freedom, 2005, HarperCollins,  (audio CD)
 JFK and the Reagan Revolution: A Secret History of American Prosperity, 2016, Portfolio, by Lawrence Kudlow (Author) and Brian Domitrovic (Author)

References

External links

 Kudlow's Money Politic$ blog
 Kudlow & Company consulting company
 Profile  at CNBC.com
 Column archive  at Townhall.com
 Column archive at National Review Online
 Column archive at Creators Syndicate
 
 

1947 births
21st-century American non-fiction writers
American bloggers
American broadcast news analysts
American business and financial journalists
American business writers
American columnists
American finance and investment writers
American financial analysts
American male bloggers
American male journalists
American talk radio hosts
Bear Stearns people
Businesspeople from New Jersey
Catholics from New Jersey
CNBC people
Connecticut Republicans
Converts to Roman Catholicism from Judaism
Dwight-Englewood School alumni
Jewish American journalists
Living people
People from Englewood, New Jersey
Reagan administration personnel
Supply-side economists
Television personalities from New Jersey
The Washington Times people
Trump administration personnel
United States Office of Management and Budget officials
University of Rochester alumni
Westwood One
Writers from New Jersey